M. Kamalam (14 August 1926 – 30 January 2020) was an Indian politician from Kerala belonging to Indian National Congress. She was a member of the Kerala Legislative Assembly and a minister of the Government of Kerala.

Biography
Kamalam was born on 14 August 1926 to Keloth Krishnan and Keloth Janaki. She was a member of the All India Congress Committee. She also served as the vice president and general secretary of the Kerala Pradesh Congress Committee. She was the chairperson of the Kerala Women's Commission too.

Kamalam started her political career as a councillor in Kozhikode Municipal Corporation. She resigned from Congress in protest against the declaration of emergency in 1975 and joined Janata Party. She contested from Calicut in 1977 in Sixth Lok Sabha election but did not win. She was elected as a member of the Kerala Legislative Assembly from  Kalpetta in 1980. Later, she joined Indian National Congress. She was also elected from that constituency in 1982. She served as the Cooperative Minister of the Government of Kerala from 1982 to 1987.

Kamalam was married to M. Samikutty. They had four sons and a daughter. The names of their sons are M. Yatheendradas, M. Murali and M. Rajagopal and the name of their lone daughter is Padmaja Charudathan.

Kamalam died on 30 January 2020 at her residence near Nadakkavu in Kozhikode at the age of 93.

References

1926 births
2020 deaths
Kerala MLAs 1980–1982
Kerala MLAs 1982–1987
Indian National Congress politicians from Kerala
Janata Party politicians
State cabinet ministers of Kerala
Politicians from Kozhikode
Women members of the Kerala Legislative Assembly